Oldendorf is a former Samtgemeinde ("collective municipality") in the district of Stade, in Lower Saxony, Germany. Its seat was in the village Oldendorf. It was disbanded on 1 January 2014, when it was merged with the Samtgemeinde Himmelpforten to form the new Samtgemeinde Oldendorf-Himmelpforten.

The Samtgemeinde Oldendorf consisted of the following municipalities:
Burweg 
Estorf 
Heinbockel 
Kranenburg 
Oldendorf

Former Samtgemeinden in Lower Saxony